This is a list of heads of government of Norway. In the modern era, the head of government has the title prime minister. At various times in the past, the highest governmental title has included steward, viceroy and first minister

Until 1873, the King of the personal union between Sweden and Norway governed Norway through two cabinets: one in Stockholm and another in Christiania (now Oslo). The newly created Stockholm cabinet consisted of a prime minister and two ministers, whose role was to convey the attitudes of the Christiania cabinet to the Swedish King. The cabinet in Christiania was led by a steward. For brief periods, the incumbent crown prince was appointed Viceroy of Norway by the King, in which case the viceroy became the highest authority in Christiania. Whenever the King was present in Christiania, however, he assumed the highest authority, thus putting the governor or viceroy temporarily out of charge. Likewise, when there was no governor, viceroy, or king present in Christiania (which was not unusual), the cabinet was led by the first minister, who was the most prominent member of the cabinet.

In July 1873, the position of governor was abolished after being vacant since 1856. Simultaneously, the post of First Minister in Christiania was upgraded to Prime Minister of Norway. Although the office of Norwegian Prime Minister in Stockholm still existed, the real power and influence over state affairs was moved to the prime minister in Christiania, while prime minister in Stockholm became the second highest cabinet position, responsible for conveying the government's views to the King. When the union was dissolved in 1905, the position of prime minister in Stockholm was abolished.

Stewards of Norway 

The Steward of Norway, styled  in Danish (riksstattholder in modern Norwegian spelling), meaning Royal steward of the realm (see Steward), was the appointed head of the Norwegian Government in the absence of the Monarch during the Dano-Norwegian union. As Norway was a separate kingdom, with its own laws and institutions, the position of Steward of Norway was arguably the most influential position for a Danish-Norwegian nobleman or royal to hold, second to the King.

Split premiership (1814–1905)

First Minister (1814–1873) 

Prior to 1884, there were no organised political parties in Norway; the prime ministers were considered senior civil servants (Embedsmenn). They were appointed by the King and were not subject to legislative confirmation. All Prime Ministers before 1884 opposed the constitutional reforms proposed by the parliamentary opposition, and were in their time viewed as conservatives. The Prime Minister was subordinate to the Steward and Viceroy, and the First Minister was subordinate to the Prime Minister. The de facto head of government was the First Minister.

Prime Minister in Christiania (1873–1905) 

In 1873 the office of the First Minister of Norway was upgraded to Prime Minister, based in Christiania. The office of Prime Minister based in Stockholm continued, with responsibility for communicating the policies of the Prime Minister in Christiania to the King, making it subordinate to the office in Christiania. In addition, a separate Prime Minister of Sweden was appointed from 1876 onwards.

Prime Ministers of Norway (1905–present) 

In 1905, the union between Sweden and Norway was dissolved. Since then the office of the Prime Minister of Norway has been in Oslo, except for the years of Nazi-German occupation during World War II when the Norwegian government was in exile in London.

Prime Ministers of Norway (1905–1940)

Heads of Government (1940–1945) 

Government sanction by Nazi Germany during the occupation of Norway. The Nygaardsvold exile government (1935–1945) is recognised as the elected government during the occupation.

Prime Ministers of Norway (1945–present)

Timeline

See also 

 List of Norwegian monarchs
 List of Norwegian governments

External links 

 Norway's Prime Ministers — A pictorial with portraits of Norway's Prime Ministers (Aftenposten)

Prime Ministers of Norway
Norway, List of Prime Ministers of
Prime Minister
Prime Minister
Prime ministers
Norway